Zalamea may refer to:

Places:
Zalamea la Real, town and municipality located in the province of Huelva, Spain
Zalamea de la Serena, municipality in the province of Badajoz, Extremadura, Spain

People:
Alberto Zalamea (1928–2011), Colombian journalist, politician and diplomat
Jorge Zalamea (1905–1969), Colombian writer known for anti-dictatorship satirical prose works

Entertainment:
 The Mayor of Zalamea, a Spanish play by Pedro Calderón de la Barca
 The Mayor of Zalamea (1920 film), a silent German film
 The Mayor of Zalamea (1954 film), a Spanish film
 The Mayor of Zalamea (1956 film), an East German film

See also
Salmea
Zalam
Zalema
Zelameta